Devaraj Bangera was the fourth Anglican Bishop - in - Karnataka Southern Diocese of Church of South India.  It was on 9 October 2004 that Bangera was consecrated as Bishop - in - Karnataka Southern Diocese headquartered in Mangalore at Shanthi Cathedral, Mangalore by then Moderator, B. P. Sugandhar and Deputy Moderator, S. Vasantha Kumar in the presence of Christopher Asir, D. P. Shettian and C. L. Furtado.

Devaraj studied at the Karnataka Theological College, Mangalore during the Principalship of Robert Scheuermeier and submitted a thesis entitled Evangelization among the Muslims in 1967 leading to a Licentiate in Theology.

References

Christian clergy from Karnataka
Kannada people
21st-century Anglican bishops in India
Anglican bishops of Karnataka Southern
Indian Christian theologians
Senate of Serampore College (University) alumni